Stagecoach Days is a 1938 American Western film directed by Joseph Levering and written by Nate Gatzert. The film stars Jack Luden, Eleanor Stewart, Harry Woods, Wally Wales, Lafe McKee and Jack Ingram. The film was released on June 20, 1938, by Columbia Pictures.

Plot

Cast          
Jack Luden as Breezy Larkin
Eleanor Stewart as Mary Larkin
Harry Woods as Moose Ringo
Wally Wales as Milt Dodds
Lafe McKee as Tom Larkin
Jack Ingram as Virg
Slim Whitaker as Butch Flint 
Tuffy as Tuffy

References

External links
 

1938 films
American Western (genre) films
1938 Western (genre) films
Columbia Pictures films
American black-and-white films
Films directed by Joseph Levering
1930s English-language films
1930s American films